Duraykish (also spelled Dreikiche) is a city in Syria, in the Tartus Governorate, at a distance of about 32 km east of Tartus. The name Dreikiche stems from Latin, and means "three caves". The town is famous for its mineral water springs located to the south of the city. The mineral water of the town is bottled and sold under the label "Dreikiche". Its inhabitants are predominantly Alawites.

References

External links
Syriatourism.org page about Duraykish

Cities in Syria
Populated places in Duraykish District
Alawite communities in Syria